Metasepia pfefferi, also known as the flamboyant cuttlefish, is a species of cuttlefish occurring in tropical Indo-Pacific waters off northern Australia, southern New Guinea, as well as numerous islands of the Philippines, Indonesia and Malaysia. The flesh of this colorful cephalopod contains unique acids, making it unsuitable for consumption.

Distribution 
The natural range of M. pfefferi extends from Mandurah in Western Australia, northeastward to Moreton Bay in southern Queensland, and across the Arafura Sea to the southern coast of New Guinea. The species has also been recorded from Sulawesi and the Maluku Islands in Indonesia, and even as far west as the Malaysian islands of Mabul and Sipadan. They are also common in the Philippines and are frequently sighted in the Visayas.

The type specimen, a female, was collected off Challenger Station 188 in the Arafura Sea at a depth of 51 m on October 9, 1874, as part of the Challenger expedition. It is deposited at The Natural History Museum in London.

Description 

M. pfefferi is a robust-looking species, having a very broad, oval mantle. Arms are broad and blade-like and have four rows of suckers. The modified arm used by males for fertilisation, called the hectocotylus, is borne on the left ventral arm. The oral surface of the modified region of the hectocotylus is wide, swollen, and fleshy. It bears transversely grooved ridges and a deep furrow running along the middle. The sucker-bearing surface of the tentacular clubs is flattened, with 5 or 6 suckers arranged in transverse rows. These suckers differ greatly in size, with the largest located near the centre of the club. Three to four median suckers are especially large, occupying most of middle portion of the club. The swimming keel of the club extends considerably near to the carpus. The dorsal and ventral protective membranes are not joined at the base of the club, but fused to the tentacular stalk. Dorsal and ventral membranes differ in length and extend near to the carpus along the stalk. The dorsal membrane forms a shallow cleft at the junction with the stalk. This particular species of cuttlefish is the only one known to walk upon the sea floor. Due to the small size of its cuttlebone, it can float only for a short time.

The dorsal surface of the mantle bears three pairs of large, flat, flap-like papillae. Papillae are also present over the eyes.

The cuttlebone of this species is small, two-thirds to three-quarters the length of the mantle, and positioned in its anterior. Characteristic of the genus Metasepia, the cuttlebone is rhomboidal in outline. Both the anterior and posterior of the cuttlebone taper gradually to an acute point. The dorsal surface of the cuttlebone is yellowish and evenly convex. The texture throughout is smooth, lacking bumps or pustules. The dorsal median rib is absent. A thin film of chitin covers the entire dorsal surface. The cuttlebone lacks a pronounced spine; if present, it is small and chitinous. The striated zone of the cuttlebone is concave, with the last loculus being strongly convex and thick in the front third. The sulcus is deep and wide and extends along the striated zone only. Striae (furrows) on the anterior surface form an inverted V-shape. The limbs of the inner cone are very short, narrow, and uniform in width, with the U-shape thickened slightly towards the back. The cuttlebone of M. pfefferi does not possess an outer cone, unlike that of most other cuttlefish species.

Habitat and biology 

M. pfefferi has been recorded from sand and mud substrate in shallow waters at depths of 3 to 86 m. The species is active during the day and has been observed hunting fish and crustaceans. It employs complex and varied camouflage to stalk its prey. The normal base color of this species is dark brown. Individuals that are disturbed or attacked quickly change colour to a pattern of black, dark brown, white, with yellow patches around the mantle, arms, and eyes. The arm tips often display bright red coloration to ward off would-be predators. Animals displaying this colour pattern have been observed using their lower arms to walk or "amble" along the sea floor while rhythmically waving the wide protective membranes on their arms. This behavior advertises a poisonous nature: The flesh of this cuttlefish contains a unique toxin.

Reproduction 
Copulation occurs face-to-face, with the male inserting a packet of sperm into a pouch on the underside of the female's mantle. The female then fertilises her eggs with the sperm. The eggs are laid singly and placed by the female in crevices or ledges in coral, rock, or wood. In one instance, around a dozen eggs were found under an overturned coconut half. They had been placed there by a female which had inserted them through the central hole of the husk. Thereby, the eggs were protected from predatory fish.

Freshly laid eggs are white, but slowly turn translucent with time, making the developing cuttlefish clearly visible. From emergence, juvenile M. pfefferi are capable of producing the same camouflage patterns as adults.

Commercial value 
A toxicology report has confirmed that the muscle tissue of flamboyant cuttlefish is highly toxic, making it only the third cephalopod found to be poisonous. Research by Mark Norman with the Museum Victoria in Melbourne, Victoria, Australia, has shown the toxin to be as lethal as that of fellow cephalopod the blue-ringed octopus.

M. pfefferi represents no interest to fisheries for the above reason. If its supply were steady, the spectacular colour and textural displays of this species would make it an excellent candidate for private aquariums. The species is sometimes seen in public aquariums, available through captive breeding programs, such as the Monterey Bay Aquarium.

References 

 Ross, R. 2010. Aquarium Invertebrates: Metasepia pfefferi – the aptly named Flamboyant Cuttlefish. Advanced Aquarist's Online Magazine.

External links 

Richard Ross video and blog of flamboyant cuttlefish on TONMO
YouTube video of a flamboyant cuttlefish
Habitat photos of the flamboyant cuttlefish
 

Cuttlefish
Molluscs described in 1885
Venomous molluscs
Taxa named by William Evans Hoyle